The Allen was a short-lived United States automobile manufactured in Philadelphia, Pennsylvania from 1913 to 1914.

The early models featured a two-cylinder engine, while later ones had a water-cooled four-cylinder version. These models also had a friction transmission and shaft drive, a  wheelbase, and a  track, costing $450.

Confusingly, another American company also offered a car called the Allen, also in 1913.

References
^ G. Marshall Naul, "Allen (i)”, in G.N. Georgano, ed., The Complete Encyclopedia of Motorcars 1885-1968  (New York: E.P. Dutton and Co., 1974), pp. 36.

Brass Era vehicles
Defunct motor vehicle manufacturers of the United States
Motor vehicle manufacturers based in Pennsylvania